Scuticaria tigrina is a moray eel found in coral reefs in the Pacific and Indian Oceans. It is commonly known as the tiger reef-eel, tiger snake moray, tiger moray eel, tiger moray, tiger eel, spotted eel, or the spotted snake moray.

References

External links
 

Muraenidae
Fish described in 1828
Taxa named by René Lesson